Johannes Skraastad (1648–1700) was a Norwegian artist from Vang. He carved a number of well-known altar pieces and pulpits, many of which can still be seen today. Skraastad is best known for carving the altar pieces in Våler Church, Øvre Rendal Church, Folldal Church, Elverum Church, Veldre Church, Tomter Church, and Hof Church as well as the pulpit at Romedal Church.

References
Hedmark, edited by Sigmund Moren, Gyldendal Norsk Forlag, Oslo 1978.

1648 births
1700 deaths
People from Hamar
Norwegian artists
Norwegian woodcarvers
Norwegian male artists